Abdul Karim Parekh (1928–2007), popularly known as Maulana, was an Indian social worker and scholar, known for his translation of Quran into Urdu language and his discourses on the Islamic religious text. Born on 	15 April 1928 at Kanseoni village in the western Indian state of Maharashtra to Abdul Latif and Hanifa as the third of the 13 children born to them, his schooling was only up to primary classes after which he worked as a labour to earn a living. He was known to have been self-taught and translated the Quran into Urdu language which reportedly had 40 re-prints. He was the founder treasurer of the All India Muslim Personal Law Board (AIMPLB) and is a recipient of the Pride of India honour from American Federation of Muslims from India (AFMI). The Government of India awarded him the third highest civilian honour of the Padma Bhushan, in 2001, for his contributions to society. He died on 11 September 2007, at the age of 79, survived by four sons and five daughters; his wife had predeceased him.

See also 
 All India Muslim Personal Law Board

References

External links

Further reading 
 
 

Recipients of the Padma Bhushan in social work
1928 births
2007 deaths
People from Nagpur district
Social workers from Maharashtra
Indian Muslims
Social workers
20th-century Indian translators